Lacibacter nakdongensis is a Gram-negative and non-spore-forming, bacterium from the genus of Lacibacter which has been isolated from sediments from the Nakdong River from Korea.

References

External links
Type strain of Lacibacter nakdongensis at BacDive -  the Bacterial Diversity Metadatabase

Chitinophagia
Bacteria described in 2017